Mississippi's 6th congressional district existed from 1873 to 1963. It was created after the United States 1870 census and abolished following the 1960 census, due to changes in population.

Boundaries
The 6th congressional district boundaries included all of Covington, Forrest, George, Greene, Hancock, Harrison, Jackson, Jefferson Davis, Lamar, Lawrence, Marion, Pearl River, Perry, Simpson and Wayne County. It also included the eastern portion of modern Walthall County (included as part of Marion County at that time) and all of modern Stone County (included as part of Harrison County at that time).

List of members representing the district

References

 Congressional Biographical Directory of the United States 1774–present

06
Former congressional districts of the United States
1873 establishments in Mississippi
1963 disestablishments in Mississippi